The Mil Mi-4 (USAF/DoD reporting name "Type 36", NATO reporting name "Hound") is a Soviet transport helicopter that served in both military and civilian roles.

Design and development
The Mi-4 was designed in response to the American H-19 Chickasaw and the deployment of U.S. helicopters during the Korean War. While the Mi-4 strongly resembles the H-19 Chickasaw in general layout, including the innovative engine position in front of the cockpit, it is a larger helicopter, able to lift more weight and built in larger numbers.  The first model entered service in 1953. The helicopter was first displayed to the outside world in 1952 at the Soviet Aviation Day in Tushino Airfield.

One Mi-4 was built with a jettisonable rotor. It served as an experimental vehicle for future pilots' means of safety and ejection designs.

Operational history
The Mi-4 transport helicopter laid the beginning of the Soviet Army Aviation. It was widely used both in the armed forces and in Soviet civil aviation, and for several decades remained the main type of helicopter in the inventory of the Soviet Armed Forces and of the Civil Air Fleet. The Mi-4 went out of service with the development of the Mi-8. It is no longer used by the Russian Air Force, though it remained in service in some countries as a utility helicopter or as a military transport a while longer. Albania was thought to be the final country using the helicopter and by 2005 all were out of service. The Mi-4 played a very important role in the Bangladesh liberation war of 1971. The Mi-4 was the workhorse of the Indian Air Force covering the medium lift role at the time. A highly successful heli-borne operation, the Meghna Heli Bridge, using Mi-4s helped the Indian Army's 57 Mountain Division clear the Meghna River. The helilift of a battalion of Indian troops to the outskirts of Sylhet was the first heli-borne operation of the Indian army.

Much like the UH-1 Huey, after it was gradually phased out of military service, it was used in various domestic roles: search and rescue, firefighting, polar expeditioning, construction site cargo helicopter, commercial flights and many others.

An official video of a North Korean Air Force combat flying skills competition released in 2014 shows that the Mi-4 is still in limited service in North Korea.

Variants
V-12
Prototype. Designation reused for the Mi-12.
Mi-4 (NATO – Hound-A)
Basic production version.
Mi-4A
Assault transport helicopter.
Mi-4AV
Armed versions based on the Mi-4A. V for Vooruzhenniy (Armed). Mi-4A with additional armament. Modification of 1967 had weapons complex K-4V, included four 9М17М ATGM "Phalanga" and 96 57-mm NAR S-5M in six blocks UB-16-57U (or six 100-kg bombs or four 250-kg bombs or tanks with an incendiary substance); 185 helicopters were converted to Mi-4AV.
Mi-4GF
Factory designation for demilitarised Mi-4 for use in the Civil Air Fleet.
Mi-4L Lyukes
Six-seat VIP transport version, sometimes converted into an air ambulance helicopter.
Mi-4VL
Fire-fighting version of Mi-4L.
Mi-4M (NATO – Hound-C)
Anti-submarine warfare helicopter with searching radar station SPRS-1 ("Kurs-M"), hydroacoustic station "Baku", additional fuel tank and rescue boat with operator in under-fuselage gun turret.
Mi-4ME
Export modification of Mi-4M.
Mi-4VM
Slightly modified version of Mi-4M, differed by some avionics system.
Mi-4MR
Upgraded version of Mi-4VM with the searching radar station "Rubin-V" instead of "Kurs-M".
Mi-4P / Mi-4VP
Civil transport helicopter, with accommodation for between 8 and 11 passengers, plus eight stretchers and a medical attendant for air ambulance duties.
Mi-4PL (NATO – Hound-B)
Anti-submarine warfare helicopter.
Mi-4PS
SAR version.
Mi-4S Salon
VIP transport helicopter.
Mi-4Skh
Multi-role agricultural helicopter, with a large chemical container in the main cabin. Also used as a fire-fighting helicopter.
Mi-4T
Major military production version, equipped with a large diameter main rotor and bulged windows.
Mi-4VM (VM-12)
Anti-submarine warfare helicopter.
Mi-4BT
Minesweeper with floats.
Mi-4RI
Mi-4M equipped with the Rion experimental sonar.
Mi-4MT
Torpedo-carrying ASW attack (killer) aircraft derived from Mi-4M.
Mi-4MU
Attack helicopter.
Mi-4MO
Search helicopter with Oka sonar.
Mi-4MS
Search helicopter with Soora infra-red sensor.
Mi-4FV (Mi-4KV)
Photographic and guidance helicopter.
Mi-4Schch
"Polar version" of Mi-4FV for working at the Soviet Arctic and Antarctic research stations.
Mi-4SP
Special rescue modification.
Mi-4PG
Experimental version equipped with an external load sling system.
Mi-4SV
Mi-4 with improved heat insulation for working in the Far North.
Mi-4N "Filin" (Horned owl)
Experimental reconnaissance version intended for night-time use.
Mi-4KK (Mi-4VKP)
Mobile command post.
Mi-4KU (Mi-4VPU)
Mobile command post for controlling Air Force units.
Mi-4U
Target-designator version carrying the Oospekh (Success) system.
Mi-4GR
Mi-4 fitted with Grebeshok-3 (Haircomb-3) wide-range panoramic detection and relay radar.
Mi-4TARK
TV-equipped artillery reconnaissance and spotting helicopter.
Mi-4MK (Mi-4PP)
ECM version.
Mi-4UM
Radio-controlled target drone version.
Harbin Z-5
Chinese military transport helicopter. Chinese production version.
Harbin Z-6
Prototype turbine powered version of the Z-5, no production undertaken.
Xuanfeng
Chinese civil transport helicopter. Chinese production version.

Unnamed Variants

Mi-4 minelayer version produced by converting troop-carrier helicopters.
Mi-4 modified for transporting and laying gas pipelines.
Mi-4 with Panorama 360  cin  camera system produced by conversion.
Mi-4 with the Pristavka (Add-on) radio equipment developed in 1957 for guidance of remote-controlled reconnaissance balloons.
Mi-4s used as testbeds. Apart from the above-mentioned versions, the Mi-4 and Mi-4A were widely used as testbeds of various kinds for testing subassemblies and systems of future aircraft, as well as equipment for other branches of industry.

Operators

 Afghan Air Force

 Albanian Air Force

 Algerian Air Force

 Bangladesh Air Force
 People's Republic of Bulgaria
Bulgarian Air Force
Bulgarian Navy

 Cambodian Air Force

People's Liberation Army Air Force

Revolutionary Armed Forces

 Czechoslovakian Air Force

East German Air Force 
East German Navy
 Lufthansa
 Interflug

 Egyptian Air Force

 Finnish Air Force
 Hungarian People's Republic
 Hungarian Air Force

 Indian Air Force

 Indonesian Air Force
 Indonesian Army

 Iraqi Air Force

 Khmer Air Force
 Laos
 Royal Lao Air Force

 Lao People's Liberation Army Air Force

Mali Air Force

Mongolian Air Force

North Korean Air Force
 Polish People's Republic
Polish Air Force
Polish Navy
 Socialist Republic of Romania
Romanian Air Force

 Somali Air Corps

Aeroflot
Soviet Air Force
Soviet Navy

 Sudanese Air Force

 Syrian Air Force

 Vietnam People's Air Force

 North Yemen Air Force

 Yugoslav Air Force

Specifications (Mi-4A)

See also

Notes

References
Bill Gunston, An Illustrated Guide to Military Helicopters, Salamander Books Ltd, London 1981. 
Bob Ogden, Aviation Museums and Collections of The Rest of the World, UK: Air-Britain 2008. 
Kenneth Conboy with James Morrison, Shadow War: The CIA's Secret War in Laos, Boulder CO: Paladin Press, 1995.

External links

Mi-04
Mil aircraft
1950s Soviet cargo aircraft
1950s Soviet military transport aircraft
1950s Soviet helicopters
Single-engined piston helicopters
Aircraft first flown in 1952